The 1906 South Carolina gubernatorial election was held on November 6, 1906, to select the governor of the state of South Carolina, United States. Martin Frederick Ansel won the Democratic primary and ran unopposed in the general election to become the 89th governor of South Carolina.

Democratic primary
The South Carolina Democratic Party held its primary for governor on August 28 and Martin Frederick Ansel emerged as the frontrunner. Ansel was vocal in his opposition to the Dispensary system set up by Ben Tillman and instead favored the local county option established by the Bryce law in 1904. His chief rival, progressive reformer Richard Irvine Manning III, sought to maintain a statewide Dispensary and work to remove all the corrupt officials in it. The public sentiment at the time felt that nobody with even the best intentions could clean up the Dispensary and therefore Ansel won the Democratic runoff on September 11 against Manning. He essentially became the next governor of South Carolina because there was no opposition in the general election.

General election
The general election was held on November 6, 1906, and Martin Frederick Ansel was elected the next governor of South Carolina without opposition. Being a non-presidential election and few contested races, turnout was much less than the previous gubernatorial election.

 

|-
| 
| colspan=5 |Democratic hold
|-

See also
Governor of South Carolina
List of governors of South Carolina
South Carolina gubernatorial elections

References

External links
SCIway Biography of Martin Frederick Ansel

Gubernatorial
1906
South Carolina
November 1906 events